This is a list of European regions (NUTS2 regions) sorted by total fertility rate. Eurostat calculates the fertility rate based on the information provided by national statistics Institutes affiliated to Eurostat. The list presents statistics for the years 2005 to 2018 from EUROSTAT, as of May 2020.

2005 to 2018 list

References 

Fertility
Demographic lists
Fertility rate